

1888
11 February - Matabeleland is declared a British South Africa Company protectorate but this is not recognized by the Ndebele
30 October - Britain renames the region Zambesia

1889
29 October - Mashonaland is declared a British South Africa Company protectorate

See also
1870s in Zimbabwe
other events of 1880s
1890s in Zimbabwe
Years in Zimbabwe

References 

Decades in Zimbabwe
Zimbabwe